Doubt (Spanish: Duda) is a 1951 Spanish drama film directed by Julio Salvador and starring Conrado San Martín, Elena Espejo and Francisco Rabal. A mixture of thriller and melodrama, it sees a lawyer forces to defend his wife in court after she is accused of murdering her first husband.

Synopsis 
Two years after the death of a rich antiquarian, his wife will be accused of his death, after her appearance in his closet of a bottle of arsenic. Her new husband is a lawyer who will be in charge of her defense.

Cast
 Conrado San Martín as Enrique Villar / Payá  
 Elena Espejo as Ana María Figueroa  
Francisco Rabal as Rafael Figueroa 
 Mary Lamar as Enfermera  
 Carlo Tamberlani as Comisario  
 Rosita Valero as Farmacéutica  
 María Brú as Doña Teresa 
 Xan das Bolas as Sereno  
 Modesto Cid as Presidente del tribunal 
 Emilio Fábregas as Farmacéutico 
 Ramón Giner as Testigo 
 José Goula as Juez  
 Luis Induni as Ayudante del comisario  
 Francisco Linares-Rivas as Fiscal 
 Juan Monfort as Ayudante del comisario 
 Rafael Navarro as Testigo  
 Luis Pérez de León as Manzanares 
 Eugenio Testa as Sr. Herrera

References

Bibliography 
 Labanyi, Jo & Pavlović, Tatjana. A Companion to Spanish Cinema. John Wiley & Sons, 2012.

External links 
 

1951 drama films
Spanish drama films
1951 films
1950s Spanish-language films
Films directed by Julio Salvador
Spanish black-and-white films
1950s Spanish films